Opal Cone is a cinder cone located on the southeast flank of Mount Garibaldi in the Coast Mountains of British Columbia, Canada. The lava flow is unusually long for a silicic lava flow. 

Opal Cone is a member of the Cascade Volcanoes, but it is located in the Garibaldi Ranges in the Coast Mountains and not in the Cascade Range proper.

See also
 List of volcanoes in Canada
 Volcanism of Canada
 Volcanism of Western Canada
 Cascade Volcanoes
 Garibaldi Volcanic Belt
 Garibaldi Lake volcanic field

External links
 Opal Cone in the Canadian Mountain Encyclopedia
 Hiking Opal Cone - Online guide for hiking to the summit

References
 Catalogue of Canadian volcanoes:Opal Cone

Subduction volcanoes
Cinder cones of British Columbia
Parasitic cones

Holocene volcanoes
Garibaldi Lake volcanic field
One-thousanders of British Columbia